Randlett may refer to:
 Randlett, Utah
 Randlett, Oklahoma